Gates of Eden is a 2006 album by the English singer and songwriter Ralph McTell. It features Ralph McTell's versions of songs by artists who have influenced his musical direction. The title of the album is taken from the Bob Dylan song of the same name.

Track listing

Personnel 
Adapted from the album line notes.

 Ralph McTell – 6-string guitar, 12-string acoustic, harmonica and national guitar on "You Got to Change Your Mind"
 Steve Turner – electric, nylon strung, acoustic and slide guitar, bass on "Gates of Eden"
 Willie Wilson – drums, percussion
 Adrian Davis – tuba, sousaphone
 Martin Frith – fiddle on "Song for Woody"
 Chris Parkinson – accordion
 Nancy March – backing vocals on "Do Re Mi"
Janet Lewis – backing vocals on "Do Re Mi"

Production
Ralph McTell - producer
Mick Dolan - recording at Village Hall, Stewedios, Cornwall June–July 2006

References 

Ralph McTell albums
2006 albums